was a Rinzai Zen roshi. He was head of Hanazono University and abbot of Daishu-in in Kyoto, one of the sub-temples of the Ryōan-ji temple complex.

Biography
He began his Zen training in his early twenties at Daishuin under Goto Zuigan, formerly abbot of Myoshin-ji and at that time abbot of Daitoku-ji, after finding himself adrift at the end of World War II. Later, he became head monk of Daitoku-ji. He was Dharma successor to Oda Sessō Rōshi, who was also a disciple of Gotō Zuigan Rōshi and who succeeded him as abbot of Daitoku-ji.

He had a number of Western students, most importantly Shaku Daijo and Ursula Jarand, both students of many years at Daishu-in in Kyoto. Shaku Daijo was there ordained as a Zen monk in 1979.  Together with Ursula Jarand, Daijo built Daishu-in West in Humboldt County in Northern California, which was inaugurated by Sōkō Morinaga as a Zen Temple of the Myoshin-ji line.

The Roshi also made annual visits of one or two weeks each Summer to England to teach at the Buddhist Society's annual summer school.  In 1984 he ordained Venerable Myokyo-ni, head of the Zen Centre closely affiliated to the London-based Buddhist Society.  Myokyo-ni was Irmgard Schloegl, an Austrian woman who had trained at Daitoku-ji while he was head monk there and whose own direct teachers (Sessō Rōshi and Sojun Rōshi) were now no longer alive. He also inaugurated her London training place Shobo-an as a Zen Temple, in the Daitoku-ji line, where the teachings of Sōkō, Sessō and Sojun continue to be practiced.

Daishu-in West is the main training place in America where The Roshi's teaching and practice of traditional Rinzai Zen may be followed.

His autobiography, Novice to Master: An Ongoing Lesson in the Extent of My Own Stupidity was first published in English in 2002.

Publications
In English:
Pointers to Insight: Life of a Zen Monk (1985)
The Ceasing of Notions: Zen Text from the Tun-Huang Caves (English translation of the German translation of Ursula Jarand, 1988)
Novice to Master: An Ongoing Lesson in the Extent of My Own Stupidity (2002)

In German:
Dialog über das Auslöschen der Anschauung - Dialogue about the Extinction of Contemplation Jarand, Ursula (translator), Frankfurt am Main: R. G. Fischer Verlag, 1987 - German translation of the Jueguanlun (Zekkanron) and Morinaga Soko Roshi's commentary on this text
Hui-neng, Das Sutra des Sechsten Patriarchen - Hui-neng: The Sutra of the Sixth Patriarch Jarand, Ursula (translator), München: O. W. Barth Verlag, 1989 - German translation of the Platform sutra and Morinaga Soko Roshi's commentary on this text

See also
Buddhism in Europe
Buddhism in Japan
List of Rinzai Buddhists

References

External links

 Daishu-in West
 Novice to Master Preface and opening chapter (25 pages) 
 There is no trash an excerpt from Novice to Master.

Zen Buddhism writers
Zen Buddhist abbots
Rinzai Buddhists
1925 births
1995 deaths
Japanese Zen Buddhists
Zen Buddhist spiritual teachers
Rōshi
20th-century Buddhist monks